The World Chess Solving Championship (WCSC) is an annual competition in the solving of chess problems (also known as chess puzzles) organized by the World Federation for Chess Composition (WFCC), previously by FIDE via the Permanent Commission of the FIDE for Chess Compositions (PCCC).

The participants must solve a series of different types of chess problem in a set amount of time. Points are awarded for correct solutions in the least amount of time. The highest score at the end of the competition is proclaimed the winner.

Format
The Tournament consists of six rounds over two days, with three rounds each day according to the following table:
Round 1 – 3 twomovers 20 minutes solving time
Round 2 – 3 threemovers  60 minutes solving time
Round 3 – 3 endgame studies 100 minutes solving time
Round 4 – 3 helpmates 50 minutes solving time
Round 5 – 3 moremovers    80 minutes solving time
Round 6 – 3 selfmates 50 minutes solving time

Sections
Team Championship – To qualify as an official team world championship, there must be at least seven teams from seven countries present. This section has grown from nine teams in 1977 to now averaging 20.
Individual – Likewise, for an official individual world championship to take place, 30 solvers from at least 10 countries must participate. This number too has grown from 18 in 1977 to well over 70 in the past six years (as of 2007).
Women and Juniors (up to 23 years old) – This event only requires 10 solvers from at least seven countries.

Rating

Formulas
For calculating ratings for players who previously did not have one, a provisional rating is given. This rating is given at the completion of the player's first tournament where the formula used is as follows:

Provisional Rating = (Average Tournament Player's Rating) x (Player's Result  /  Average Result At Tournament)

For players who have previously established a rating the following formula demonstrates how a new rating is achieved.

New Rating = (Old Rating) + (KT) x (Player's Result - (Average Result x Old Rating / Average Tournament Old Rating))

KT = Tournament Coefficient (Ranging from 4 to 1 depending on strength of competition)

Current rating list
October 1st 2015, Top 10:

 GM Georgy Evseev (RUS) 2785
 GM Kacper Piorun (POL) 2744
 GM Piotr Murdzia (POL) 2742
 GM John Nunn (GBR) 2716
 GM Ram Soffer (ISR) 2667
 GM Eddy Van Beers (BEL) 2632
 GM Anatoly Mukoseev (RUS) 2631
 GM Arno Zude (GER) 2626
 GM Jonathan Mestel (GBR) 2595
 GM Ofer Comay (ISR) 2594

Winners

Team competition

1977 – 
1978 – 
1979 – 
1980 – 
1981 – 
1982 – 
1983 – 
1984 – 
1985 – 
1986 – 
1987 – 
1988 – 
1989 – 
1990 –  and 
1991 – 
1992 – 
1993 – 
1994 – 
1995 – 
1996 – 
1997 – 
1998 – 
1999 – 
2000 – 
2001 – 
2002 – 
2003 – 
2004 – 
2005 – 
2006 – 
2007 – 
2008 – 
2009 – 
2010 – 
2011 – 
2012 – 
2013 – 
2014 – 
2015 – 
2016 – 
2017 – 
2018 – 
2019 – 
2021 – 
2022 –

Individual competition

1983 – Roland Baier (Switzerland)
1984 – Kari Valtonen (Finland)
1985 – Ofer Comay (Israel)
1986 – Pauli Perkonoja (Finland)
1987 – Michel Caillaud (France)
1988 – Michael Pfannkuche (Germany)
1989 – Georgy Evseev (USSR)
1990 – Georgy Evseev (USSR)
1991 – Georgy Evseev (USSR)
1992 – Pauli Perkonoja (Finland)
1993 – Michael Pfannkuche (Germany)
1994 – Arno Zude (Germany)
1995 – Pauli Perkonoja (Finland)
1996 – Noam Elkies (Israel)
1997 – Jonathan Mestel (Great Britain)
1998 – Georgy Evseev (Russia)
1999 – Ofer Comay (Israel)
2000 – Michel Caillaud (France)
2001 – Jorma Paavilainen (Finland)
2002 – Piotr Murdzia (Poland)
2003 – Andrey Selivanov (Russia)
2004 – John Nunn (Great Britain)
2005 – Piotr Murdzia (Poland)
2006 – Piotr Murdzia (Poland)
2007 – John Nunn (Great Britain)
2008 – Piotr Murdzia (Poland)
2009 – Piotr Murdzia (Poland)
2010 – John Nunn (Great Britain)
2011 – Kacper Piorun (Poland)
2012 – Piotr Murdzia (Poland)
2013 – Piotr Murdzia (Poland)
2014 – Kacper Piorun (Poland)
2015 – Kacper Piorun (Poland)
2016 – Kacper Piorun (Poland)
2017 – Kacper Piorun (Poland)
2018 – Piotr Murdzia (Poland)
2019 – Piotr Górski (Poland)
2021 – Danila Pavlov (Russia)
2022 – Danila Pavlov (Russia)

References

Solving
Chess problems